The George Price Highway is one of four main highways in Belize.  It originates in Belize City, runs west through Hattieville, the Belize Zoo, the capital city of Belmopan (northern outskirts), San Ignacio, San José Succotz (across the river from Xunantunich archaeological site) and terminates at the Guatemalan border at Benque Viejo.  The highway bisects the country and ties the eastern and western parts of Belize together. A new steel bridge over Beaver Dam Creek was constructed to replace the broken concrete one.

The highway was built in the 1930s and was originally known as the Western Highway. It was renamed the George Price Highway in 2012, after the late former prime minister who led the country to independence in 1981.

History 
2003, September 20.  The Beaver Dam Creek Bridge was reconstructed as a new steel bridge to replace the old broken concrete bridge.

2012, September 20. The Western Highway was renamed the George Price Highway in honour of George Price.

2016, July. A new roundabout was constructed at the junction of the George Price Highway and the Hummingbird Highway.

2020, March 20. The Roaring Creek Bridge was reconstructed due to the old bridge being too narrow and getting congested.

Junction list

References 

Roads in Belize